Live at the Lighthouse is a live album by jazz group The Three Sounds featuring performances recorded in 1967 at the Lighthouse Club in California and released on the Blue Note label.

Reception
The Allmusic review by Stephen Thomas Erlewine awarded the album 4 stars stating "The music on Live at the Lighthouse is hotter than some of their studio recordings, pulsating with energy and good feelings, demonstrating that they had worked out any of the problems that hampered Vibrations. It's their finest set since Black Orchid". The All About Jazz review by C. Andrew Hovan stated "Live at the Lighthouse captures The Three Sounds at or near their peak and in one of only three live performances ever caught on tape. Let's cherish it".

Track listing
All compositions by Gene Harris except as indicated
 "Still I'm Sad" (Jim McCarty, Paul Samwell-Smith) - 2:53 
 "Crying Time" (Buck Owens) - 2:31
 "June Night (Just Give Me a June Night, the Moonlight and You)" (Abel Baer, Cliff Friend) - 7:08 
 "I Thought About You" (Johnny Mercer, Jimmy Van Heusen) - 5:54 
 "I Held My Head in Shame" - 2:56 
 "Summertime" (George Gershwin, Ira Gershwin, DuBose Heyward) - 4:58 
 "Makin' Bread Again" - 3:44 
 "Here's That Rainy Day" (Johnny Burke, Van Heusen) - 4:30 
 "Blues March" (Benny Golson) - 3:50 
 "Takin' It Easy" - 2:15 Bonus track on CD reissue 
 "Drown in My Own Tears" (Henry Glover) - 3:35 Bonus track on CD reissue 
 "Why (Am I Treated So Bad)" (Roebuck Staples) - 2:59 Bonus track on CD reissue 
 "Never Say Yes" (Nat Adderley) - 7:17 Bonus track on CD reissue 
 "River Shallow" (André Previn, Dory Previn) - 4:15 Bonus track on CD reissue 
 "Sunny" (Bobby Hebb) - 4:25 Bonus track on CD reissue 
 "Bad, Bad Whiskey" (Maxwell Davis, Amos Milburn) - 2:01 Bonus track on CD reissue 
 "C Jam Blues" (Barney Bigard, Duke Ellington) - 2:07 Bonus track on CD reissue 
Recorded at the Lighthouse Club in Hermosa Beach, California on June 9 & 10, 1967

Personnel
Gene Harris - piano, organ
Andrew Simpkins - bass
Donald Bailey - drums

References

Blue Note Records live albums
The Three Sounds live albums
1967 live albums
Albums recorded at the Lighthouse Café